Lijo Paul (born 10 October 1984) is a Kerala State Award-winning Indian film editor who works in Malayalam films.

Film career 
Lijo Paul started working as an independent editor with the Malayalam film Vellaripravinte Changathi (2011). He got break in his second film Romans (2013). His work on the 2014 Malayalam film Ohm Shanthi Oshaana got him the Kerala State Film Awards for Best Editing in that year.

Filmography

Film editor

Awards

Kerala State Film Awards
 2014 – Kerala State Film Award for Best Editor for Ohm Shanthi Oshaana

References

External links 
 

Living people
1984 births
Malayalam film editors
Kerala State Film Award winners